Mount Picossa is a mountain in Catalonia, Spain. It is located within the Móra d'Ebre municipal limits, Ribera d'Ebre. 

The summit used to be a breeding ground for Bonelli's eagle, but in the last few years the birds have failed to reproduce. Human disturbance has been deemed to be the cause and the access to the mountain has been restricted.

Geography
Mount Picossa is an isolated hill of the Catalan Central Depression.
There is a triangulation station at the top marked "251139001". The Serra de Cavalls can be seen in the horizon looking south.

History
During the Battle of the Ebro of the Spanish Civil War there was an observation point of the Republican Military on top of the hill which was bombed by the Francoist faction before the collapsing of the front. The 42nd Division camped at the hill on 8 November 1938 during its withdrawal, having lost many of its troops and its pace being hampered by the many wounded. By 10 November the Francoists had occupied Mount Picossa.

See also
Mountains of Catalonia

References

External links
La Picossa hiking routes

Picossa
Ribera d'Ebre